Notable members of the Sons of Confederate Veterans have included:
Trace Adkins (born 1962), country singer-songwriter
Ellis Arnall (1907–1992), Georgia governor
W. Tate Brady (1870–1925), merchant, politician, Ku Klux Klan member, and a "founder" of Tulsa, Oklahoma.
Phil Bryant (born 1954), Mississippi governor
Pat Buchanan (born 1938), journalist, writer, media consultant, and U.S. presidential candidate
Frank Buckles (1901–2011), United States Army corporal and the last surviving American military veteran of World War I
R. Gregg Cherry (1891–1957), North Carolina governor
John E. Courson (born 1944), South Carolina state senator
Fred Henry Davis (1894–1937), lawyer and judge who served in several elected offices in Florida
Bobby DeLaughter (born 1958), Mississippi state prosecutor, judge, and author
Larry Darby (born 1957), attorney in Montgomery, Alabama
Clint Eastwood (born 1930), film actor, director, producer, composer, pianist, and politician
H. K. Edgerton (born 1948), African-American activist for Southern heritage
Charles R. Farnsley (1907–1990), U.S. representative from Kentucky
Orval Faubus (1910–1994), Arkansas governor
Nathan Bedford Forrest II (1871–1931), businessman and activist who served as the 19th Commander-in-Chief of the Sons of Confederate Veterans
MacDonald Gallion (1913–2007), Alabama attorney general
R. Michael Givens (born 1958), film director and cinematographer
Gordon Gunter (1909–1998), marine biologist and fisheries scientist
Dorsey B. Hardeman (1902–1992), Texas state senator
Michael C. Hardy (born 1972), historian and author of Civil War and western North Carolina books and articles
Harry B. Hawes (1869–1947), U.S. senator from Missouri
Jesse Helms (1921–2008), U.S. senator from North Carolina and U.S. presidential candidate
Douglas Selph Henry Jr. (1926–2017) member of the Tennessee General Assembly, serving in both the House and Senate
James Hylton (1934–2018), race car driver
John Karl "Jack" Kershaw Nashville, Tennessee attorney, sculptor, and co-founder of the League of the South.
Donald Livingston, Emory University professor and co-founder of the Abbeville Institute
Trent Lott (born 1941), U.S. senator from Mississippi
Creighton Lovelace (born 1981), pastor of Danieltown Baptist Church in Forest City, North Carolina
Loy Mauch (born 1952), member of the Arkansas House of Representatives
Robert Stacy McCain (born 1959), journalist, writer, and blogger
William David McCain (1907–1993), archivist and college president
Glenn F. McConnell (born 1947), president of the College of Charleston and the 89th lieutenant governor of South Carolina 
Arieh O'Sullivan (born 1961), former Israeli soldier, author, journalist, and defense correspondent
Arthur Ravenel Jr. (born 1927), businessman and a Republican politician from Charleston, South Carolina
Charley Reese (1937–2013), newspaper columnist
Absalom Willis Robertson (1887–1971), U.S. senator from Virginia, father of televangelist Pat Robertson
Lloyd M. Robinette (1881–1951), Virginia lawyer and politician
Floyd Spence (1928–2001), U.S. representative from South Carolina,
Walbrook D. Swank (1910–2008), World War II officer and a noted historical author
Strom Thurmond (1902–2003), governor, U.S. senator from South Carolina, and U.S. presidential candidate
Harry S. Truman (1884–1972), 33rd president of the United States
William M. Tuck (1896–1983), governor and U.S. representative from Virginia
Danny Verdin (born 1964), South Carolina state senator
Bradley Walker (1877–1951), Nashville attorney and athlete 
Alexander W. Weddell (1876–1948), diplomat
Robert Wilkie (born 1962), United States Secretary of Veterans Affairs
Guinn Williams (1871–1948), U.S. representative from Texas
Joe Wilson (born 1947), U.S. representative from South Carolina
Ron Wilson (born 1943), businessman convicted of his role in a $90 million Ponzi scheme in 2012, 68th Commander-in-Chief of the Sons of Confederate Veterans 
Nelson W. Winbush (born 1929), African-American educator
Scott Wyatt (born 1969), politician
Ralph E. "Rick" Reeves, schoolteacher

References

External links 

Sons of Confederate Veterans Politicians at The Political Graveyard

Members